Caloneurodea is an extinct order of polyneopteran neopteran insects in the superorder Orthopterida.  The Caloneurodea are known from fossils found in North America, Europe, Russia, and Asia and had a palegeographic range confined to Laurussia.

Families and genera

Order Caloneurodea
 Amboneuridae
 Amboneura
 Anomalogrammatidae
 Anomalogramma 
 Apsidoneuridae 
 Apsidoneura 
 Homaloptila  
 Sinaspidoneura 
 Caloneuridae 
 Caloneura  
 Gigagramma  
 Ligogramma  
 Euthygrammatidae
 Euthygramma
 Paleuthygrammatidae
 Paleuthygramma
 Pseudogramma  
 Vilvia
 Vilviopsis
 Permobiellidae
 Permobiella
 Pseudobiella
 Pleisiogrammmatidae
 Pleisiogramma 
 Synomaloptilidae
 Synomaloptilidae
 Caloneurella
 Pruvostiella
 Family Incertae sedis
Lusitaneura

References

External links

Triassic insects
Extinct insect orders
Orthopterida